Qeru Chay (also Romanized as Qerū Chāy; also known as Karreh Chīyeh, Kurreh Chīa, Qūrī Chā’ī, Qūrīchā’ī, and Qūrī Chāy) is a village in Quri Chay Rural District, in the Central District of Dehgolan County, Kurdistan Province, Iran. At the 2006 census, its population was 2,987, in 713 families. The village is populated by Kurds.

References 

Towns and villages in Dehgolan County
Kurdish settlements in Kurdistan Province